Philosophische Studien  (Philosophical Studies) was the first journal of experimental psychology, founded by Wilhelm Wundt in 1881. The first volume was published in 1883; the last, the 18th, in 1903. Wundt then founded a similar volume entitled Psychologische Studien, with volumes from 1905 to 1917.

Other early psychology journals

In 1887, G. Stanley Hall, who studied with Wundt in 1879, founded The American Journal of Psychology.

In 1890, Hermann Ebbinghaus and Arthur König founded , then known as Zeitschrift für Psychologie und Physiologie der Sinnesorgane.

In 1903, one of Wundt's habilitants, Ernst Meumann, founded Archiv für die gesamte Psychologie.

References

External links
 Philosophische Studien, completely digitised in the Virtual Laboratory of the Max Planck Institute for the History of Science

1883 establishments in Germany
Experimental psychology journals
German-language journals
Publications established in 1883
Publications with year of disestablishment missing
History of psychology journals
Defunct journals